The Victim is a 2011 American horror film directed, written and starring Michael Biehn,  produced by and co-starring Jennifer Blanc.
Thought to be a financial success due to Biehn's effort selling out theaters across the nation, neither he or producer Jennifer Blanc know final sales figures, due to open litigation with the film's investors.

The film was produced and shot in less than two weeks in Los Angeles in 2010. Most of the principal photography took place in the Topanga Canyon, close to Malibu, California.

Cast
 Michael Biehn as Kyle Limato
 Jennifer Blanc as Annie
 Ryan Honey as Harrison
 Danielle Harris as Mary
 Denny Kirkwood as Coogan

Reception

Alan Cerny of Ain't It Cool News characterized The Victim as "a fun sleazy grindhouse film", in which Biehn was lauded for both giving a good performance and getting good performances out of his actors. Though Cerny stated that Biehn's directing effort exhibited imperfections such as a driving montage scene that he felt was too long, he appreciated that Biehn understood the genre in which he was working, commenting, "Biehn has a clear path to what he's shooting for, and for much of the film's running time, he gets it", and "It's a specific genre with a specific style, and working from that, Biehn gets way more right than he does wrong."

The New York Times wrote, "Directing his own screenplay, Mr. Biehn (working from a story by Reed Lackey) pays more attention to genitals than spatial coherence, unaware that labeling a film grind house doesn’t excuse soap-opera emoting and laughable dialogue. Wait, what am I saying? Of course it does." The film has a 35% approval rating on Rotten Tomatoes, based on 17 reviews.

References

External links

 
 
 

2011 films
2011 horror films
2011 horror thriller films
2010s psychological horror films
2011 psychological thriller films
American horror thriller films
American psychological horror films
American psychological thriller films
Films directed by Michael Biehn
Films shot in California
2010s English-language films
2010s American films